The Monroe Sports Arena is a 2,000 seat multi-purpose arena located in Monroe, Washington, United States on the campus of Monroe High School. It was home to the Snohomish County Explosion of the International Basketball League. The Monroe High School gymnasium was renamed the Monroe Sports Arena in 2008 after $10,000 worth of renovations made for the IBL season.

Sports venues in Washington (state)
Basketball venues in Washington (state)
Buildings and structures in Snohomish County, Washington
Tourist attractions in Snohomish County, Washington
Monroe, Washington